Marcus Henry (born February 11, 1993) is an American football center who is a free agent. He played college football at Boise State University.

Early years
Henry attended Bellevue High School. He was a two-way player, while contributing to the school winning the 3A State Championship in 2009 and 2010. As a junior, he received second-team All-conference honors. As a senior, he received All-state, All-Kingco and Kingco Conference Lineman of the Year honors.

College career
Henry accepted a football scholarship from Boise State University. As a redshirt freshman, he appeared in 11 games, playing on the special teams units. 

As a sophomore, he started 12 games at guard. He missed the season finale against University of New Mexico with an injury. As a junior, he started all 14 games. 

As a senior, he started all 13 games. He finished his college career after playing in 50 games with 39 starts.

Professional career

New Orleans Saints
Henry was signed as an undrafted free agent by the New Orleans Saints after the 2016 NFL Draft on May 2, 2016. He was waived during final roster cuts on September 3, 2016. In November 2016, he suffered a torn ACL during a workout with the Buffalo Bills. In February 2018, he played in The Spring League in Austin, Texas, after being out football for a year, while recovering from his knee injury.

Seattle Seahawks
Henry signed with the Seattle Seahawks on May 7, 2018, after a mini-camp tryout. He was waived on August 3, and re-signed nine days later. He was waived during final roster cuts on September 1, and signed to the team's practice squad on September 19. He was released on September 25, and re-signed to the practice squad on December 19.

Henry signed a reserve/futures contract with the Seahawks on January 8, 2019, but was waived before the start of training camp on May 1.

New Orleans Saints (second stint)
After participating in a mini-camp tryout, Henry re-signed with the New Orleans Saints on May 13, 2019. He was waived during final roster cuts on August 31, 2019.

Houston Texans
Henry signed with the Houston Texans' practice squad on October 9, 2019, and was released one week later.

Dallas Cowboys
Henry signed with the Dallas Cowboys' practice squad on November 20, 2019. He signed a reserve/futures contract with the Cowboys on December 30.

Henry was waived during final roster cuts on September 5, 2020, and re-signed to the team's practice squad the next day. He was elevated to the active roster on October 10 and October 19 for the team's weeks 5 and 6 games against the New York Giants and Arizona Cardinals, and reverted to the practice squad following each game. He signed a reserve/future contract with the Cowboys on January 4, 2021. He was waived by the Cowboys on March 19, 2021.

Arizona Cardinals
On July 26, 2021, Henry signed with the Arizona Cardinals. He was waived/injured on August 31, 2021 and placed on injured reserve. He was waived off injured reserve on September 9, 2021. He was re-signed to the practice squad on November 1. He was promoted to the active roster on November 9. He was waived on May 16, 2022.

References

External links
Boise State Broncos bio

1993 births
Living people
Sportspeople from Bellevue, Washington
Players of American football from Washington (state)
American football centers
Boise State Broncos football players
New Orleans Saints players
Seattle Seahawks players
Houston Texans players
Dallas Cowboys players
Arizona Cardinals players